Harry Mohr Weese (June 30, 1915 – October 29, 1998) was an American architect who had an important role in 20th century modernism and historic preservation. His brother, Ben Weese, is also a renowned architect.

Early life and education

Harry Mohr Weese was born on June 30, 1915 in Evanston, Illinois as the first son of Harry E. and Marjorie Weese. His father was an Episcopalian, and his mother was a Presbyterian. In 1919, the family moved to a house in Kenilworth, Illinois, where Harry would be raised. Weese was enrolled in the progressive Joseph Sears School in 1919. By 1925, Weese decided that he wanted to be either an artist or an architect.

After graduating from New Trier High School, Weese enrolled at the Massachusetts Institute of Technology in 1933 to earn a Bachelor in Architecture degree. Weese also took architecture classes at Yale University starting in 1936. Weese studied under Alvar Aalto at MIT, and fraternized with classmates I.M. Pei and Eero Saarinen. As his schooling was at the height of the Great Depression, Weese avoided studying expensive historical revival styles in favor of more-affordable modern styles. In the summer of 1937, Weese toured northern Europe on a bicycle, fostering his appreciation for the modernist movement.

Upon his return to the United States, Weese was offered a fellowship at the Cranbrook Academy of Art (sometimes called the "Scandinavian Bauhaus") through Eero Saarinen, whose father Eliel oversaw the school. There, he studied city planning, pottery, and textiles while learning more about Modernist principles. He worked alongside other emerging Modernist designers such as Ralph Rapson, Florence Knoll, and Charles Eames.

Career
 
Weese formed an architectural partnership in Chicago with classmate Benjamin Baldwin upon their graduation in 1940. He would later marry Baldwin's sister, Kitty. Following the brief partnership, Weese joined the firm of Skidmore, Owings and Merrill (SOM). Soon after joining, however, Weese enlisted as an engineering officer in the United States Navy for World War II. Weese moved back to Chicago after the war in 1945 and rejoined SOM.

In 1947, Weese started his independent design firm,  Harry Weese Associates. His first commissions, such as the Robert and Suzanne Drucker House in Wilmette, Illinois, were houses for family members and close associates. By the late 1950s, Weese began to receive major commissions. Although he continued to plan houses, Weese also built civic projects such as the Metropolitan Correctional Center in Chicago.

The Washington Metro in the District of Columbia helped Weese become the foremost designer of rail systems during the peak of his career. He subsequently was commissioned to oversee rail projects in Miami, Los Angeles, Dallas, and Buffalo. He was named a Fellow of the American Institute of Architects in 1961 and received the Arnold W. Brunner Memorial Prize from the National Institute of Arts and Letters in 1964.

Weese was also well known for his firm advocacy of historic preservation, and was remembered as the architect who "shaped Chicago’s skyline and the way the city thought about everything from the lakefront to its treasure-trove of historical buildings". He led the restoration of Adler & Sullivan's Auditorium Building, and Daniel Burnham's Field Museum of Natural History and Orchestra Hall. Harry Weese & Associates received the Architecture Firm Award from the American Institute of Architects (AIA) in 1978. Weese also served as a judge for the Vietnam Veterans Memorial design competition, and helped defend fledgling architect Maya Lin's unconventional design against her critics.

In the late 1970s, Weese was involved in the inception of the effort to host a 1992 World's Fair in Chicago.

From the mid-1980s, Weese drank heavily and his reputation faded; he died after years of going in and out of alcohol rehabilitation and a series of disabling strokes.

Personal life 
Weese's parents were Protestant Christians, but he himself was non-religious. While being interviewed by the building committee of the Seventeenth Church of Christ, Scientist in Chicago, when asked of his religious views, he said, "My father was Episcopalian, my mother Presbyterian, and I’m an architect".

Legacy
In  a 1998 obituary, architectural critic Herbert Muschamp wrote that "Mr. Weese designed a systemwide network of stations that rank among the greatest public works of this century", referring to his design of the Washington Metro system. Muschamp noted that the vaulted ceilings at the crossings of subway lines "induce an almost religious sense of awe".

In 2007, the design of the Washington Metro's vaulted-ceiling stations was voted number 106 on the "America's Favorite Architecture" list compiled by the American Institute of Architects (AIA), and was the only brutalist design to win a place among the 150 selected by this public survey. In January 2014, the AIA announced that it would present its Twenty-five Year Award to the Washington Metro system for "an architectural design of enduring significance" that "has stood the test of time by embodying architectural excellence for 25 to 35 years".  The announcement cited the key role of Harry Weese, who conceived and implemented a "common design kit-of-parts" which continues to guide the construction of new Metro stations over a quarter-century later.

Works

Weese is best known as the designer and architect of the first group of stations in the Washington Metro system. Other well known works include:
 Robert and Suzanne Drucker House (1954) in Wilmette, Illinois
 The Davis Clinic in Marion, Indiana (1952)- a new model for delivering healthcare.
 Alpha Sigma Phi, Alpha Xi Chapter House at Illinois Institute of Technology in Chicago
 The United States Embassy Building in Accra, Ghana, closed in 1998 
 Arena Stage (1960), Washington DC (remodeled in 2010 by Bing Thom Architects)
 Time-Life Building (1969), Chicago
 First Baptist Church (1965), in Columbus, Indiana
 Seventeenth Church of Christ, Scientist (1968) in Chicago
 The Marcus Center for the Performing Arts (1969) in Milwaukee
 The 411 East Wisconsin Center (1985), in Milwaukee
 The Humanities Building at the University of Wisconsin–Madison (1969), widely considered one the Midwest's best examples of brutalist architecture but slated for demolition by 2030. 
 The Chazen Museum of Art at the University of Wisconsin–Madison, formerly known as the Elvehjem Museum of Art
 The Upper School (high school) building (1969) of The Latin School of Chicago in Chicago
 Pierce Tower (1960), an undergraduate residence hall at the University of Chicago (demolished 2013)
 Mercantile Bank, Kansas City, Missouri
 Westin Crown Center Hotel (1973), Kansas City, Missouri
 Fulton House (1981) at 345 N. Canal Street in Chicago. Converted 19th century 16-story cold-storage warehouse building to condominium building.
 Fewkes Tower at 55 W. Chestnut Street (formerly 838 N. Dearborn Street) (1966) in Chicago
 River Cottages at 357-365 N. Canal Street in Chicago. Sloped, structurally expressive facade responds to the angle and cross bracing of the railroad bridge directly across the river.
 William J. Campbell United States Courthouse Annex in downtown Chicago (formerly known as the Metropolitan Correctional Center, Chicago.) (1975) Federal temporary holding prison which has no window bars, instead each cell is provided with a vertical 5" slot window. Weese was mandated to follow then new federal prison architectural guidelines, like cells having no bars and by original design each prisoner was housed separately.
 Middletown City Building, Middletown, Ohio
 Formica Building (1970), Cincinnati
 Sterling Morton Library (1963), The Morton Arboretum
 O'Brian Hall at the State University of New York at Buffalo
 The Healey Library at the University of Massachusetts Boston
 The Given Institute, Aspen Colorado (demolished 2011)
 St Thomas' Episcopal Church, (Menasha, Wisconsin) (1963) A striking building, similar to the aforementioned First Baptist Church in Columbus, Indiana, but with an even more sweeping roof design and towering steeple.
 Swissôtel, Chicago. The cross-section is an equilateral triangle, so that two-thirds of the rooms have a view of the main stem of the Chicago River.

Weese also led numerous restoration projects including:
 Louis Sullivan's Auditorium Building in Chicago (1967)
 Field Museum of Natural History, Chicago
 Orchestra Hall, Chicago
 Union Station, Washington DC

Weese designed over 80 single home and residential buildings, including:
 His primary residence in Barrington, Illinois
 "Shadowcliff", Ellison Bay, Wisconsin
 Evanston, Illinois
 Glen Lake, Michigan
 Muskoka Lakes, Ontario, Canada
 Red House, Barrington, Illinois
 Wayne, Illinois

References

Further reading

External links 
 Oral history interview with Harry Weese - Art Institute of Chicago.

Modernist architects from the United States
 
Preservationist architects
1915 births
1998 deaths
Architects from Chicago
Artists from Evanston, Illinois
Fellows of the American Institute of Architects
MIT School of Architecture and Planning alumni
Cranbrook Academy of Art alumni
20th-century American architects
20th-century  American  historians
People from Kenilworth, Illinois